Nebothriomyrmex is a genus of ants in the subfamily Dolichoderinae containing the single species Nebothriomyrmex majeri. The genus is known from Western Australia.

References

External links

Dolichoderinae
Monotypic ant genera
Hymenoptera of Australia